Jonathan Mark Sleightholme (born  in Malton, North Yorkshire) is a former rugby union player who played on the wing for Grimsby, Hull Ionians Wakefield, Bath, Northampton Saints, Yorkshire, England Sevens and England.

He played twelve times for England scoring four tries and also has played for the Barbarians.

He is a qualified PE teacher  and is currently Managing Director Rugby for Sport2Business. He is currently working as a rugby coach at Cokethorpe School, Witney.

References

External links
Scrum.com player statistics

1972 births
Living people
Alumni of the University of Bath
Alumni of the University of Chester
Bath Rugby players
England international rugby union players
English rugby union players
Northampton Saints players
Rugby union players from Yorkshire
Team Bath rugby union players
Wakefield RFC players
Yorkshire County RFU players
Rugby union wings